Milfred Stephen Laurent (December 26, 1901 – October 25, 1995), nicknamed "Rick", was an American Negro league outfielder in the 1920s and 1930s.

A native of New Orleans, Louisiana, Laurent broke into the Negro leagues in 1921 with the New Orleans Crescent Stars. He went on to play for several teams over a 17-year career, concluding his career back with the Crescent Stars from 1933 to 1937. He was inducted into the Greater New Orleans Sports Hall of Fame in 1980, and died in New Orleans in 1995 at age 93.

References

External links
 and Seamheads
 Milfred 'Rick' Laurent at Negro League Baseball Players Association

1901 births
1995 deaths
Birmingham Black Barons players
Cleveland Cubs players
Memphis Red Sox players
Nashville Elite Giants players
New Orleans Crescent Stars players
Baseball outfielders
Baseball players from New Orleans
20th-century African-American sportspeople